The 1911 Idaho football team represented the University of Idaho in the 1911 college football season.  Idaho was led by seventh-year head coach John "Pink" Griffith and played as an independent; they joined the Pacific Coast Conference eleven years later

Schedule

 One game was played on Friday (against Washington State in Moscow) and one on Thursday (at Utah in Salt Lake City on Thanksgiving)

References

External links
Gem of the Mountains: 1913 University of Idaho yearbook (spring 1912) – 1911 football season
Go Mighty Vandals – 1911 football season
Idaho Argonaut – student newspaper – 1911 editions

Idaho
Idaho Vandals football seasons
Idaho football